Red Bluff is an unincorporated settlement and adjoining Indian Reserve community located just south of Quesnel, British Columbia, Canada.  The community includes Quesnel Indian Reserve No. 1, one of the reserves of the Red Bluff First Nation and is generally also referred to as Red Bluff.

See also
Rich Bar, British Columbia
Dragon Lake, British Columbia

References

Populated places on the Fraser River
Unincorporated settlements in British Columbia
Populated places in the Cariboo Regional District
Geography of the Cariboo